Our Fathers can refer to:
Our Fathers (novel), a 1999 novel by Scottish novelist Andrew O'Hagan
Our Fathers (film), a 2005 American TV film

See also
Our Father (disambiguation)